Tenderloin is a musical with a book by George Abbott and Jerome Weidman, lyrics by Sheldon Harnick, and music by Jerry Bock, their follow-up to the highly successful Pulitzer Prize-winning Fiorello! a year earlier.  The musical is based on a 1959 novel by Samuel Hopkins Adams.  Set in the Tenderloin, a red-light district in 1890s Manhattan, the show's story focuses on Reverend Brock, a character loosely based on American clergyman and social reformer Charles Henry Parkhurst.

Productions
After six previews, the Broadway production, directed by Abbott and choreographed by Joe Layton, opened on October 17, 1960, at the 46th Street Theatre, where it ran for 216 performances. The cast included Maurice Evans (better known as a Shakespearean actor than a musical performer) as Reverend Brock and Ron Husmann as Tommy.

Tony Award nominations went to Evans for Best Actor in a Musical, Husmann for Best Featured Actor in a Musical, and Cecil Beaton for Best Costume Design in a Musical, and Husmann won the Theatre World Award for his performance.

An original cast recording was released by Capitol Records, and Bobby Darin's recording of "Artificial Flowers" reached #20 on the Billboard charts.

The musical was produced in New York City Center's Encores! staged concert series in March 2000, directed by Walter Bobbie and choreographed by Rob Ashford. The cast included David Ogden Stiers (Brock), Debbie Gravitte (Nita), Tom Alan Robbins (Joe), Patrick Wilson (Tommy), Sarah Uriarte Berry (Laura), Kevin Conway (Lt. Schmidt), and Jessica Stone (Margie).

A concert cast recording was released by DRG Records.

Synopsis
Reverend Brock, a single-minded 1890s social reformer works to sanitize the Tenderloin, a red-light neighborhood in western Manhattan.  He is foiled by everyone associated with the district, including the corrupt politicians and police who are taking their cut from the earnings of the prostitutes who work the streets there. Tommy Howatt, a writer for the local scandal sheet Tatler, infiltrates the minister's church and proceeds to play one side against the other, eventually framing Brock by revealing to the authorities his plan to raid the brothels, but ultimately saving him by siding with him at his trial. As a result, the Tenderloin is shut down and Brock, asked to resign from his church, heads for Detroit with the hope of succeeding there as well.

Songs

Act I
 Bless This Land – Chorus
 Little Old New York – Nita, Gertie, Girls, All
 Dr. Brock – Brock
 Artificial Flowers – Tommy, Jessica, All
 What's in it for You? – Tommy, Brock
 Reform – Girls
 Tommy, Tommy – Laura
 The Picture of Happiness – Tommy, Margie, Chorus
 My Miss Mary – Company
 Dear Friend – Brock, Group
 The Army of The Just – Martin, Tommy, Brock, Men
 How the Money Changes Hands – Company

Act II
 Good Clean Fun – Brock, Chorus
 My Miss Mary – Tommy, Laura, Chorus
 My Gentle Young Johnny – Nita
 The Trial – Company
 The Tenderloin Celebration – Frye, Gertie, Company
 Reform (Reprise) – Liz, Nellie, Margie, Girls
 Tommy, Tommy (Reprise) – Laura
 Little Old New York (Reprise) – Company

Characters
Reverend Brock – an idealistic old preacher
Tommy Howatt – an ambitious young reporter
Laura Crosbie – a society girl who falls for Tommy
Ellington Dupont Smythe II – Laura's elegant young suitor
Purdy – Laura's wealthy uncle
Bridget – Purdy's maid
Frye – a detective
Gertie – a vivacious young prostitute
Joe Kovack – a farmer who discovered coal on his land
Nita – escapes prostitution when she falls in love with Joe
Margie – one of the girls Tommy shares a musical act with
Jessica Havemeyer – clerk at the church Parish House
Martin – a prudish church choirmaster
Mrs. Barker – a church lady and friend of Rev. Brock
Chairman – officiates over the trial of the Tenderloin
Deacon – an old man who Tommy hires to take pictures
Rooney – a police officer
Sergeant – collects the money all the derelicts give the police
Schmidt – a corrupt police lieutenant
Derelicts; Prostitutes at Clark's tavern (Pearl, Maggie, Nellie, Liz)

Background
William and James Goldman were called in to doctor the show. "We'd been writing those other things and somebody must have read it and liked it and we were probably cheap and they asked us to do it," recalls William Goldman. Goldman also said the writer they replaced would not leave the project. "It was terrifying."

References

External links
 
 Tenderloin at the Music Theatre International website

1960 musicals
Broadway musicals
Musicals based on novels
Musicals by George Abbott
Musicals by Jerry Bock
Musicals by Sheldon Harnick
Plays set in New York City